League of West Herzegovina Canton is a fourth level league in the Bosnia and Herzegovina football league system. The league champion is promoted to the Second League of the Federation of Bosnia and Herzegovina - South.

Member clubs
List of clubs competing in 2020–21 season: 
 HNK Drinovci
 HNK Junak Srđevići
 HNK Kupres '97
 HNK Mesihovina
 NK Rakitno
 NK Šujica
 NK Šator Glamoč

References

4
Bos